Biała Dama is an unflavored vodka produced by Polmos Łańcut. According to its producer it has delicate, unobtrusive aromatic note of neutral grain spirits. It contains 40% alcohol by volume.

The vodka has a tradition of more than 200 years. Biała Dama (pl: White Lady) refers to a ghost of Julia Potocka, whose mother established the distillery in Łańcut.

See also 
 Vodka
 Distilled beverage
 Polmos Łańcut
 List of vodkas

External links 
Polmos Łańcut

Polish vodkas